The women's long jump competition at the 2004 Summer Olympics in Athens was held at the Olympic Stadium on 25–27 August.

Competition format
The competition consisted of two rounds, qualification and final. In qualification, each athlete jumped three times (stopping early if they made the qualifying distance). At least the top twelve athletes moved on to the final; if more than twelve reached the qualifying distance, all who did so advanced. Distances were reset for the final round. Finalists jumped three times, after which the eight best jumped three more times (with the best distance of the six jumps counted).

Schedule
All times are Greece Standard Time (UTC+2)

Records
, the existing World and Olympic records were as follows.

No new records were set during the competition.

Results

Qualifying round
Rule: Qualifying standard 6.65 (Q) or at least 12 best qualified (q).

Final

References

External links
Official Olympic Report

W
Long jump at the Olympics
2004 in women's athletics
Women's events at the 2004 Summer Olympics